The blue-bellied black snake (Pseudechis guttatus), also known commonly as the spotted black snake, is a species of venomous snake in the family Elapidae. The species is native to Australia.

Geographic range
P. guttatus is endemic to the inland areas of south-eastern Queensland and north-eastern New South Wales, Australia.

Habitat
The preferred natural habitats of P. guttatus are grassland, shrubland, and savanna.

Description

Diet
P. guttatus is carnivorous. Its diet consists of frogs, lizards, and small mammals.

Reproduction
P. guttatus, like most other snakes, is oviparous, laying 7–12 eggs during the breeding season.

Venom
The average venom ejection of P. guttatus is unknown. When mice are bitten, the snake's venom is the second most toxic of all the Australian black snakes. It is naturally very shy, and will not bite unless provoked (by being stepped on by a boot, prodded by a stick, etc.). A human, if bitten, may suffer severe pain, nausea, vomiting, diarrhoea, diaphoresis and regional lymphadenopathy at the location of the bite, similar to a red-bellied black snake's bite symptoms. Bites are infrequent. If bitten, tiger snake antivenom is the preferred treatment.

References

Further reading
Cogger HG (2014). Reptiles and Amphibians of Australia, Seventh Edition. Clayton, Victoria, Australia: CSIRO Publishing. xxx + 1,033 pp. .
De Vis CW (1905). "A New Genus of Lizards". Annals of the Queensland Museum 6: 46–52. (Pseudechis guttata, new species, pp. 49–50).
Wilson S, Swan G (2013). A Complete Guide to Reptiles of Australia, Fourth Edition. Sydney: New Holland Publishers. 522 pp. .

Pseudechis
Reptiles described in 1905
Snakes of Australia